Carex mariposana is a species of sedge known by the common name Mariposa sedge.

Description
Carex mariposana produces dense clumps of stems up to about 90 centimeters in maximum height and narrow leaves up to about 30 centimeters long. The inflorescence is a dense or open cluster of gold, brown, or reddish spikes. The fruit is covered with a sac called a perigynium which is generally greenish or coppery brown, veined, and winged.

Distribution and habitat
This sedge is native to the Sierra Nevada of California and far western Nevada, where it grows in moist areas such as meadows.

References

External links
Jepson Manual Treatment - Carex mariposana
Carex mariposana - Photo gallery

mariposana
Flora of California
Flora of Nevada
Flora of the Sierra Nevada (United States)
Natural history of Mariposa County, California
Plants described in 1917
Flora without expected TNC conservation status